Eddie O'Brien (born 12 January 1945 in Passage West, County Cork) is a former Irish sportsperson. He played hurling with his local club Passage and with the Cork senior inter-county team in the 1960s and 1970s.

Playing career

Club
O'Brien played his club hurling with his local club in Passage. He enjoyed some success at juvenile levels before moving onto the club’s top team.  Passage played in the county intermediate championship and last won the title in 1960, prior to O'Brien's playing days.  He played with the club's tp team throughout the 1960s and 1970s, however, he enjoyed little success apart from a city division senior football title in 1969.  O'Brien was regarded as a better Gaelic footballer than a hurler and is considered to be Passage's greatest ever footballer.

Inter-county
O'Brien first came to prominence on the inter-county scene as a member of the Cork minor hurling team in the early 1960s.  He lined out for Cork in this grade in 1963, however, his side was defeated in the early rounds of the championship.  In 1964 O'Brien was a key member of both the Cork under-21 hurling team.  Success was slow in coming but the big breakthrough for Cork and O'Brien came in 1966.  That year he won a Munster title with the under-21 team following a 5-12 to 2-6 defeat of Limerick .  The subsequent All-Ireland final saw Cork play Wexford in an interesting encounter.  After an entertaining sixty minutes of hurling both sides finished level with Cork scoring 3-12 to Wexford’s 5-6.  The replay took place shortly afterwards, however, both sides finished all square again with 4-9 apiece.  A second replay had to be played to eventually find a winner. At the third time of asking Cork emerged victorious with a huge tally of 9-9 to 5-9.  This victory gave Cork their first All-Ireland title in this grade and gave O'Brien an All-Ireland under-21 medal.

By this stage O'Brien was already a member of the Cork senior hurling team.  He made his debut in 1965, however, Cork were thrashed by Tipperary in the Munster final. In spite of this O'Brien was not a member of the panel in 1966 when Cork captured both the Munster and All-Ireland titles.

By 1969, however, O'Brien  was back on the senior team.  That year he tasted success early in the year Cork defeated Wexford by 3-12 to 1-14 to take the National Hurling League title.  This victory gave Cork a huge boost going into the Munster campaign where the team qualified to meet Tipperary in the final.  Cork were out to avenge the nine-point defeat administered by the same side in 1968 while Tipp were out to capture a third provincial title in-a-row.  The game was a major triumph for Cork as ‘the Rebels’ won by 4-6 to 0-9.  It was a victory that made up for all the beatings that Tipp had dished out to Cork in the early part of the decade and it gave O'Brien a first Munster winners’ medal.  This victory paved the way for an All-Ireland showdown with Kilkenny.  The game was there for the taking for Cork, particularly after Kilkenny forward Pat Delaney left the field on a stretcher.  ‘The Rebels’ led ‘the Cats’ coming into the last quarter, however, Kilkenny scored five unanswered points in the last seven minutes to win by 2-15 to 2-9.

In 1970 Cork were still regarded as one of the best teams in the country and expectations were high.  At the start of the year Cork defeated New York with an aggregate score of 5-21 to 6-16 to take the National League title.  It was O'Brien's second winners’ medal in the competition.  For the third year in-a-row Cork qualified for the Munster final where Tipperary provided the opposition.  It was the first eighty-minute final in the history of the provincial championship and a close affair developed.  At the final whistle Cork were the victors by 3-10 to 3-8 and O'Brien captured his second Munster title.  Cork later qualified for the All-Ireland final where Wexford were the opponents.  On the night before the final O'Brien has admitted to sneaking away from the hotel where his team mates were staying and went to a pub in Dún Laoghaire where he drank nine pints of Guinness.  This didn't affect his impact on the game the following day in a game that broke all records with a huge 64-point score line.  O'Brien scored a hat-trick of goals to help his team to a 6-21 to 5-10 victory.  It was his only All-Ireland medal.

Career statistics

Club

Inter-county

References

1945 births
Living people
Passage hurlers
Ballygunner hurlers
Cork inter-county hurlers
All-Ireland Senior Hurling Championship winners